Troy Franklin (born February 6, 2003) is an American football wide receiver for the Oregon Ducks.

High school career
Franklin attended Menlo-Atherton High School in Atherton, California. During his high school career he had 102 receptions for 1,790 receiving yards and 34 total touchdowns. Franklin was selected to play in the 2021 All-American Bowl. He committed to the University of Oregon to play college football.

College career
Franklin played in all 14 games as a true freshman at Oregon in 2021. He finished the year with 18 receptions for 209 yards and two touchdowns. He returned to Oregon in 2022 as the team's number one receiver.

College statistics

References

External links
Oregon Ducks bio

Living people
Players of American football from California
American football wide receivers
Oregon Ducks football players
2003 births